David Fitzgerald Doyle (December 1, 1929 – February 26, 1997) was an American actor. He was best known for his portrayal of John Bosley on the 1970s TV series Charlie's Angels. Doyle and Jaclyn Smith were the only actors to appear in every episode of the show. Doyle also became known later as the voice of Grandpa Lou on the Nicktoon Rugrats.

Early life
Doyle was born in Lincoln, Nebraska, the son of Mary Ruth (née Fitzgerald) and Lewis Raymond Doyle, an attorney. He graduated from Campion High School in Prairie du Chien, Wisconsin in 1947.

His maternal grandfather, John Fitzgerald, was a prominent railroad builder and banker in Nebraska. His younger sister, Mary (1931–1995), was a stage actress, who died from lung cancer aged 63.

Career
Doyle is best remembered for his role as detective John Bosley on the television series Charlie's Angels, one of only two actors (the other being original angel Jaclyn Smith) to appear in all 110 episodes of the series (1976–1981).

Doyle made a number of appearances as a guest on the game show Match Game from 1977 to 1982. He appeared on one week of Password Plus in 1980, three weeks of Super Password, and on Tattletales with his wife Anne in 1982.

He voiced Grandpa Lou Pickles on the Nickelodeon animated series Rugrats from 1991 until his death, after which he was replaced by Joe Alaskey.

Doyle was also a stage actor. He played Orgon in the 1964 premiere of Richard Wilbur's translation of Tartuffe at the Fred Miller Theater in Milwaukee. His sister Mary played the maid, Dorine, in the same production. His New York stage credits include Beg, Borrow or Steal, Something About a Soldier, Here's Love, I Was Dancing, and a revival of South Pacific.

Personal life
Doyle was married twice. In 1956 he married his first wife, Rachael, with whom he had a daughter, Leah (born 1961). Rachael died in 1968 after falling from a staircase. The next year, while in a revival of the play South Pacific, Doyle met Anne Nathan, a singer-dancer, and they married a short time later.

Death
Doyle died in Los Angeles, California, of a heart attack on February 26, 1997, at age 67, and was cremated.

Filmography

Film

Television

References

External links
 
 
 

1929 births
1997 deaths
20th-century American male actors
American male film actors
American male television actors
American male voice actors
Actors from Lincoln, Nebraska